Chi Leonis, Latinized from χ Leonis, is a double star in the constellation Leo. It is visible to the naked eye with an apparent visual magnitude of 4.63. The distance to this star, as determined using parallax measurements, is around 95 light years. It has an annual proper motion of 346 mas.

This is most likely a binary star system. The primary component is an evolved, F-type giant star with a stellar classification of F2III-IVv. It has an estimated 162% of the Sun's mass and nearly twice the Sun's radius. The companion is a magnitude 11.0 star at an angular separation of 4.1″ along a position angle of 264°, as of 1990.

References

F-type giants
Leo (constellation)
Leonis, Chi
Leonis, 63
096097
054182
4310
Durchmusterung objects
Double stars